Val-d'Or Airport  is located  south of Val-d'Or, Quebec, Canada.

Airlines and destinations

Accidents and incidents
On 19 June 1970, Douglas C-47A CF-AAC of Austin Airways was written off in an accident.
The aircraft landed safely at Montreal.

See also
 List of airports in the Val-d'Or area

References

External links

Certified airports in Abitibi-Témiscamingue
Val-d'Or